Josef Loisinger is a former Austrian Paralympic athlete. He represented Austria at the 1988 Summer Paralympics held in Seoul, South Korea and he won the silver medal in the men's pentathlon 3 event. He also competed at the 1992 Summer Paralympics and the 1996 Summer Paralympics.

References

External links 
 

Living people
Year of birth missing (living people)
Place of birth missing (living people)
Paralympic athletes of Austria
Athletes (track and field) at the 1988 Summer Paralympics
Athletes (track and field) at the 1992 Summer Paralympics
Athletes (track and field) at the 1996 Summer Paralympics
Paralympic silver medalists for Austria
Medalists at the 1988 Summer Paralympics
Paralympic medalists in athletics (track and field)
Austrian pentathletes
Austrian male wheelchair racers
20th-century Austrian people